Gmina Baranów is a rural gmina (administrative district) in Kępno County, Greater Poland Voivodeship, in west-central Poland.

Villages
Gmina Baranów contains the villages and settlements of Baranów, Baranów Osiedle Murator, Donaborów, Grębanin, Jankowy, Joanka, Łęka Mroczeńska, Marianka Mroczeńska, Mroczeń, Słupia pod Kępnem, and Żurawiniec.

Neighbouring gminas
Gmina Baranów is bordered by the gminas of Bralin, Kępno, Łęka Opatowska, Rychtal, Trzcinica, and Wieruszów.

References
Polish official population figures 2006

Baranow
Kępno County